Granville is a village in Putnam County, Illinois, United States. The population was 1,427 at the 2010 census, up from 1,414 in 2000, making it the largest community in Putnam County. It is part of the Ottawa Micropolitan Statistical Area.

History
The village of Granville is named after Granville, Massachusetts. The founding of the St. Paul Mine in neighboring Mark in 1903 and the Berry Mine in nearby Standard in 1905 caused Granville to expand from a farming center to become a commercial center in a coal mining region.

On April 20, 2004, Granville was struck by a series of tornadoes, which destroyed the local primary school, the high school baseball diamond, and numerous houses.

Geography
Granville is located at  (41.262480, -89.227949).

Demographics

As of the census of 2000, there were 1,414 people, 591 households, and 395 families residing in the village. The racial makeup of the village was 97.88% White, 0.42% African American, 0.07% Native American, 0.42% Asian, 0.71% from other races, and 0.50% from two or more races. Hispanic or Latino of any race were 3.39% of the population.

There were 591 households, out of which 29.8% had children under the age of 18 living with them, 54.8% were married couples living together, 8.1% had a female householder with no husband present, and 33.0% were non-families. 30.5% of all households were made up of individuals, and 17.3% had someone living alone who was 65 years of age or older. The average household size was 2.39 and the average family size was 2.95.

In the village, the population was spread out, with 24.8% under the age of 18, 7.6% from 18 to 24, 24.7% from 25 to 44, 25.8% from 45 to 64, and 17.0% who were 65 years of age or older. The median age was 40 years. For every 100 females, there were 86.1 males. For every 100 females age 18 and over, there were 84.2 males.

The median income for a household in the village was $41,548, and the median income for a family was $55,093. Males had a median income of $41,932 versus $21,364 for females. The per capita income for the village was $20,074. About 3.6% of families and 4.1% of the population were below the poverty line, including 5.5% of those under age 18 and 6.2% of those age 65 or over.

Notable people

 Edward K. Hall (1870–1932), football coach
 Red Ruffing (1905–1986), professional baseball
 Charles T. Wardlaw (1858–1928), politician

References

Villages in Putnam County, Illinois
Ottawa, IL Micropolitan Statistical Area